Garry Guzzo (born November 18, 1941) is a former politician in Ontario, Canada.  He was a Progressive Conservative member of the Legislative Assembly of Ontario from 1995 to 2003. He represented the ridings of Ottawa–Rideau and Ottawa West—Nepean.

Background
Guzzo was educated at the University of Ottawa. He graduated with a Bachelor of Commerce degree and a law degree. He practiced as a lawyer with the firm of Chiarelli and Guzzo from 1969 to 1976, was a provincial court judge from 1978 to 1989. He practiced for a short time as counsel with the firm Kelly, Howard, Santini and then operated a private practice in Ottawa until 1999. He also served as a director of the city's Riverside Hospital.

Politics
Guzzo was elected for a three-year term to Ottawa City Council as an alderman for Capital Ward in 1969.

In the provincial election of 1971, he ran as the Progressive Conservative candidate in Ottawa Centre, and came within 182 votes of defeating future New Democratic Party leader Michael Cassidy.  From 1974 to 1976, he served as a Councillor in the regional municipality of Ottawa-Carleton.

Guzzo ran for the Ontario legislature a second time in the provincial election of 1995, and defeated Liberal incumbent Yvonne O'Neill by about 1,500 votes in the riding of Ottawa—Rideau.  The Progressive Conservatives won a majority government in this election under Mike Harris; despite being the only Tory Member of Provincial Parliament (MPP) from Ottawa, however, Guzzo was not appointed to cabinet.

In the 1999 provincial election, Guzzo won re-election in the redistributed riding of Ottawa West—Nepean against Liberal Rick Chiarelli and New Democratic incumbent Alex Cullen. (The Harris government had previously reduced the number of ridings from 130 to 103, forcing several incumbents to face one another for re-election.)  He was again left out of cabinet in the parliament which followed, and became best known for a private member's bill calling for an investigation into rumours of an organized pedophile ring in Cornwall, Ontario.

In 2003, Guzzo criticized his own government for unveiling its budget at the headquarters of Magna International, rather than in the legislature.  Later in the year, he courted controversy by making favourable comments about former United States Senator Joseph McCarthy, and criticizing "illegal refugees" for burdening the province's taxation system. These comments may have contributed to his defeat in the provincial election of 2003; Guzzo lost to former Ottawa Mayor Jim Watson by just under 3,000 votes.

Electoral record

References

External links
 

1941 births
Canadian people of Italian descent
Living people
Progressive Conservative Party of Ontario MPPs
Ottawa city councillors
Ottawa controllers
University of Ottawa alumni
21st-century Canadian politicians